The 1978–79 season was the 33rd season in Rijeka’s history and their 17th season in the Yugoslav First League. Their 5th place finish in the 1977–78 season meant it was their fifth successive season playing in the Yugoslav First League.

Competitions

Yugoslav First League

Classification

Results summary

Results by round

Matches

First League

Source: rsssf.com

Yugoslav Cup

Source: rsssf.com

Cup Winners' Cup

Source: worldfootball.net

Squad statistics
Competitive matches only.

See also
1978–79 Yugoslav First League
1978–79 Yugoslav Cup
1978–79 European Cup Winners' Cup

References

External sources
 1978–79 Yugoslav First League at rsssf.com
 Prvenstvo 1978.-79. at nk-rijeka.hr

HNK Rijeka seasons
Rijeka